UEFA Euro 2024 is a football tournament scheduled to take place in June and July 2024 involving 24 men's national teams from nations affiliated to the Union of European Football Associations (UEFA). The tournament will be broadcast via television and radio all over the world.

Television

UEFA

Rest of the world

References

Broadcasting Rights
2024